Milan Ćurčić (born 19 July 1976) is a Serbian former professional basketball player.

College career 
For two seasons, between 1996 and 1998, Ćurčić played college basketball for the Kentucky-based Lindsey Wilson College of the NAIA Mid-South Conference.

Playing career 
Ćurčić had a stint with Crvena zvezda of the Yugoslav League in the 1993–94 season. In this season, he won a Yugoslav Championship playing together with Saša Obradović, Mileta Lisica, Aleksandar Trifunović, Dejan Tomašević and others.

Following his college career, Ćurčić returned to Yugoslavia. He played there for Zdravlje, NIS Vojvodina, and Lavovi 063. He retired as a player with Lavovi in 2003.

References

External links
 Player Profile at eurobasket.com
 Player Profile at proballers.com

1976 births
Living people
Basketball players from Belgrade
KK Crvena zvezda players
KK Lavovi 063 players
KK Vojvodina Srbijagas players
KK Zdravlje players
Lindsey Wilson Blue Raiders athletes
Serbian men's basketball players
Serbian expatriate basketball people in the United States
Yugoslav men's basketball players
Small forwards